Moccona is a brand of coffee owned by JDE Peet's. It is grown in China, Malaysia and Vietnam, and is available in Australia, Finland, New Zealand, Russia, Singapore, South Korea and Thailand.

Varieties
Moccona comes in the following flavour variations:
 Classic Medium Roast
 Classic Dark Roast
 Caramel
 Vanilla
 Hazelnut
 Temptation
 Indulgence
 Mystique
 Espresso
 Caffè Mocha Kenya
 Select
 Classic Half Caff
 Decaffeinated

External links 
 Moccona Australia website
 Moccona New Zealand website
 Moccona Russia website
 Malaysia Online Flagship Store

References 

JDE Peet's
Coffee brands